Briar's Book by Tamora Pierce, is a fantasy novel set in the fictional duchy of Emelan. It is the fourth and final book in the Circle of Magic quartet, starring the four young mages Sandry, Tris, Daja and Briar as they learn to handle powerful magic, form intense bonds of friendship and stand up against destructive forces of nature.

Plot introduction

The main protagonist of the book is Briar Moss, a young ex-thief and "green" or plant mage, having ambient magic with all forms of plant life. Through his eyes the book explores themes of poverty and social injustice, as a deadly plague named the Blue Pox strikes The Mire, the poorest quarter of Emelan's capital city, Summersea.

Plot summary

To Briar, the Mire is familiar territory, having been first a street-rat and then a thief in Deadman's District, the poorest quarter of his native Hajra, before his magic was discovered by the great mage Niklaren Goldeye and he was taken to Winding Circle, a temple school for ambient mages.  One day while out running errands with his teacher, Rosethorn, Briar is summoned to the Mire to examine Flick, a poor friend affected by a strange illness. Puzzled by what he has encountered, Briar enlists   Rosethorn's help. The two bring the feverish girl to Urda's House, (a small charity hospital), where they learn that Flick is by far not the only one affected; many other people from the poorest parts of Summersea are ill as well. They also learn, to Briar's dismay, that the hospital has been put under quarantine to help stop the "blue pox"—so named for the bluish sores that mark the skin—from spreading even further.

Trapped in Urda's House due to the quarantine, Rosethorn and Briar are kept busy with caring for the patients. Together with the healers, they come to the conclusion that it isn't the blue spots that are necessarily dangerous, but the fever. Even more troubling is the fever's apparent resistance to willowbark tea, a usually successful remedy.

These revelations don't make the task of caring for patients any easier, however, and over the next few days many of them—including Flick—pass away. Eventually it's realized that the quarantine on Urda's House is useless; the plague has already spread to the whole of Summersea. Briar and Rosethorn are given leave, and travel back to Winding Circle, where Sandry, Tris and Daja spend the night with Briar in the altar room to help him cope with Flick's death.

Rosethorn works with Dedicate Crane and a team of Air mages to find a cure for the sickness. But it is Briar's sharp-eyed friend Tris who discovers the first real breakthrough; the origin of the disease. With Niko's help, she learns that the disease was a result of a magical experiment gone wrong and disposed of incorrectly.

Unfortunately, just as things start to look bright in the search for a cure for the blue pox, an accident in Crane's lab causes Rosethorn to become sick with it as well. This causes Briar to work twice as hard, determined not to lose Rosethorn as he had lost Flick, and slowly a cure begins to develop. (Rosethorn continues to send notes to Crane through Briar.)

After several days, the cure is deemed to be safe and Crane tests it on Rosethorn. She starts to recover, but has a bad cough, which develops into pneumonia. Lark goes to find a healer, but while she is gone, Rosethorn has a seizure.  Briar, not wanting to lose his teacher, plunges after her into death, magically linking himself to the three girls and his beloved shakkan, or miniature tree. Suspended in a sort of limbo, he finds Rosethorn in a garden, and they argue fiercely. Only after he threatens to sever the magical cords linking him to life does she agree to return with him.

Upon their return, they discover that Rosethorn has temporarily lost her ability to speak, due to the seizure and the accompanying block of oxygen flow to her brain. But that appears to be the only lasting damage, and the blue pox has vanished for good.

A month later, Briar and the girls are on the roof. Sandry comments that it is the four's birthday, they have all been at Discipline Cottage for a year. Everyone has to leave for various reasons, leaving Briar alone. He contemplates birthdays, and decides his birthday will be the following day, the day Rosethorn invited him to her garden. She calls up to him and tells him to come down and start weeding.

Characters

Lady Sandrilene fa Toren (A.K.A. Sandry) : A girl who was of noble birth, and a friend of Briar's. She is an ambient mage, with control over weaving. She is also the first of the four to get a student (in Magic Steps).
Trisana Chandler (A.K.A. Tris): Another friend of Briar's who can control the weather.  Commonly called as a weather witch, she studies weather and the sea with Niko.
Daja Kisubo: A Trader girl who is Briar's friend.  Her ambient magic consists of metal and fire.  She is able to put magic into the creations that she smiths in the forge.
Briar Moss: The main character in this book. He has plant magic, which allows him to grow plants, nourish plants, and talk to them for information.  His studies extends to the use of plants as medical herbs.
Niklaren Goldeye (A.K.A. Niko) : A powerful mage that brought Sandrilene, Tris, Daja, and Briar to Winding Circle. Niko is also Tris's teacher, since there wasn't another mage with the same magic as Tris.
Frostpine: Daja's teacher, and is the only other mentioned smith mage.
Rosethorn: Briar's teacher, and also the other protagonist in Briar's Book.
Lark: Sandry's teacher because she also has thread magic.
Little Bear: A fast-growing dog that Sandry and her friends had rescued in Sandry's Book.

References

1999 fantasy novels
1999 American novels
Emelanese books